Derek John Watt (born November 7, 1992) is an American football fullback for the Pittsburgh Steelers of the National Football League (NFL). He played college football at Wisconsin, and was drafted by the San Diego Chargers in the sixth round of the 2016 NFL Draft. His older brother is J. J. Watt, and his younger brother is Steelers teammate T. J. Watt.

Early life
Watt was born the middle son of three boys to Connie, a building operations vice president, and John Watt, a firefighter. He, his older brother Justin ("J. J."), and younger brother Trent ("T. J.") were born and raised in Pewaukee, Wisconsin.

He attended and played high school football at Pewaukee High School.

Watt attended University of Wisconsin-Madison, where he was teammates with his brother T. J. from 2012 to 2015.

College career
Watt played at the University of Wisconsin from 2011 to 2015. He was part of the offense that helped running back Melvin Gordon amass record-breaking rushing yards during his Badger career. 

In the 2012 season, Watt had 12 receptions for 150 receiving yards. In the 2013 season, he had three receptions for 20 receiving yards. In the 2014 season, he only appeared in three games on the season. In his final collegiate season in 2015, he had 15 receptions for 139 receiving yards. Gordon and Watt went on to reunite as teammates when Watt was drafted by the Chargers in 2016.

Professional career
Pro Football Focus rated Watt the second-best fullback in the 2016 draft overall, and he also received the second-best blocking grade among fullbacks in the draft.

San Diego/Los Angeles Chargers
Watt was drafted by the San Diego Chargers in the sixth round (198th overall) in the 2016 NFL Draft. He made his NFL debut in the season opener against the Kansas City Chiefs. Two weeks later, against the Indianapolis Colts, he had his first professional reception, which went for six yards. On October 30, against the Denver Broncos, he had a 53-yard reception. Overall, in his rookie season, he played in all 16 games and had four receptions for 83 receiving yards. In the 2017 season, he appeared in all 16 games and had six carries for 24 rushing yards to go along with two receptions for 35 receiving yards. In the 2018 season, he appeared in all 16 games and had four carries for 11 rushing yards to go along with one reception for two yards. In the 2019 season, Watt appeared in all 16 games, started two, and recorded a rushing touchdown to go along with three receptions for 32 receiving yards.

Pittsburgh Steelers
On March 26, 2020, Watt signed a three-year, $9.75 million deal with the Pittsburgh Steelers, reuniting with his brother T. J. On December 21, 2020, he was knocked out as a gunner as he was concussed after being blocked into former Badgers teammate Alex Erickson on a punt return. After spending the whole season with zero yards on offense, Watt ran his first rushing plays with the Steelers in the Wild Card game. During week 8 of the 2022 season at the Philadelphia Eagles, Watt caught a one-yard touchdown on a throw from wide receiver Chase Claypool.

Personal life
Watt married Gabriella Justin in 2018. The couple's first child, son Logan James Watt, was born in February 2019,and their second son, Brayden George Watt, was born in December 2020.

In 2020, Watt appeared in a Subway commercial with his brothers J. J. and T. J. along with their parents John and Connie. Derek, J. J. and T. J. are also the hosts for the TV show Ultimate Tag.

References

External links
Twitter
Pittsburgh Steelers bio
Los Angeles Chargers bio
Wisconsin Badgers bio

1992 births
Living people
American football fullbacks
American people of Scottish descent
Los Angeles Chargers players
People from Pewaukee, Wisconsin
Pittsburgh Steelers players
Players of American football from Wisconsin
San Diego Chargers players
Sportspeople from the Milwaukee metropolitan area
Sportspeople from Waukesha, Wisconsin
Wisconsin Badgers football players